Phtheochroa pistrinana is a species of moth of the family Tortricidae. It is found in China (Beijing, Jiangxi, Xizang, Gansu), Japan, Korea, Mongolia and the Russian Far East (Dsharkent, Minussinsk, Irkutsk, Amur).

References

Moths described in 1877
Phtheochroa